Hunawng is a major village in Homalin Township, Hkamti District, in the Sagaing Region of northwestern Burma. It lies on the Chindwin River on the other side of the river from Homalin Airport.

References

External links
Maplandia World Gazetteer

Populated places in Hkamti District
Homalin Township